Radio Times (currently styled as RadioTimes) is a British weekly listings magazine devoted to television and radio programme schedules, with other features such as interviews, film reviews and lifestyle items. Founded in May 1923 by John Reith, then general manager of the British Broadcasting Company (from 1 January 1927, the British Broadcasting Corporation), it was the world's first broadcast listings magazine.

It was published entirely in-house by BBC Magazines from 8 January 1937 until 16 August 2011, when the division was merged into Immediate Media Company. On 12 January 2017, Immediate Media was bought by the German media group Hubert Burda.

The magazine is published on Tuesdays and carries listings for the week from Saturday to Friday. Originally, listings ran from Sunday to Saturday: the changeover meant 8 October 1960 was listed twice, in successive issues. Since Christmas 1969, a 14-day double-sized issue has been published each December containing schedules for two weeks of programmes. Originally this covered Christmas and New Year (also included bank holidays) on some occasions those each appeared in separate editions, with the two-week period ending just before the New Year.

History and profile

Publication

The Radio Times was first issued on 28 September 1923 for the price of 2d, carrying details of programmes for six BBC wireless stations (2LO, 5IT, 2ZY, 5NO, 5WA and 5SC); newspapers at the time boycotted radio listings fearing that increased listenership might decrease their sales. It included a message to "listeners" by the BBC's chairman, Lord Pease. Initially, The Radio Times was a combined enterprise between the British Broadcasting Company and publishers George Newnes Ltd within the latter typeset, printed and distributed the magazine. In 1925, the BBC assumed full editorial control, but printing and distribution could not begin in-house until 1937. The Radio Times established a reputation for using leading writers and illustrators, and the covers from the special editions are now collectable design classics. By 26 September 1926, the narrow columns of BBC's wireless programme schedules were broken up by the insertion of a photograph or two – relevant to or depicting subjects of the broadcasts. On 1 May 1927, The Radio Times produced an experimental Braille edition under the auspices of the National Institute for the Blind with its success led to a regular weekly version publication costing one penny. From 15 January 1933, the introduction of a weekly crossword puzzle heralded as popular as ever within the pubilcation making its first-ever appearance.

From 5 January 1934, the three-column programme pages were expanded to include a fourth column with the BBC's television programmes given a new section layout (on 8 January), and The Radio Times announced a regular series of "experimental television transmissions by the Baird process" for half an hour every night at 11.00pm. The launch of the first regular 405-line television service by the BBC was reflected with television listings in The Radio Times London edition of 23 October 1936. Thus, Radio Times became the first-ever television listings magazine in the world. Initially, only two pages in each edition were devoted to television, which ran from Monday to Saturday and remained off-air on Sundays.

After 14 years, from issue 693 (cover date 8 January 1937), that definitive article word "The" was no longer used on the masthead within the magazine, and the publication became simply known as Radio Times; they also published a lavish photogravure supplement in the same issue. Prior to the German invasion of Poland on 1 September 1939, the BBC radio listings provided a National Programme for the whole of the United Kingdom, and the Regional Programme appeared in seven different versions (London, Midlands, North, West, Wales, Northern Ireland and Scotland) each with a combination of various transmitters respectively before the two stations merged into a single service, and included three pages of television listings.

When Britain declared war with Germany on 3 September 1939 and the television broadcasting ceased, radio listings continued throughout the war with a reduced service. From 23 June 1944, the Allied Expeditionary Forces edition carried details of all the programmes for the Home Service and General Forces Programme. The same year, paper rationing meant editions were only 20 pages of tiny print on thin paper. Radio Times expanded with regional editions introduced from 29 July 1945, and television resumed once again on 7 June 1946. On 4 March 1948, the weekend listing schedules for three BBC radio networks were doubled together with daytime and evening sections in additional four pages a week, as well as weekday billings also used by the same layout which adds 12 extra pages of more articles and detailed programmes bringing up to 40 (or 44 for the television edition) on 1 July 1949.

From 18 January 1953, the television listing schedules, which had been in the back of the magazine, were placed alongside daily radio schedules. On 17 February 1957 (shortly after the abolition of "Toddlers' Truce", in which transmissions terminated between 6.00 and 7.00pm), television listings were moved to a separate section at the front with radio listings relegated to the back; a day's listings were sometimes spread over up to three double-page spreads mixed with advertisements, but this format was phased out when independent publishers were allowed to publish television schedules. The new layout was structured thusly:

From 8 October 1960, BBC television and radio schedules were re-integrated; the programmes included a new 'pick of the week' with a single third page for previews, before each day's listings; these came before the two pages of television and the four pages of radio. A new bolder masthead was designed by Abram Games (who created graphical designs such as the 'Festival Star' on the cover of the 1951 Festival of Britain and the 1953 'Bat's Wings' ident) and containing the words "BBC TV and Sound" on the left side, was introduced with this revamp; it became one of the shortest-used designs in the magazine's history. On 4 August 1962, when Radio Times was again revamped, the masthead was replaced with one incorporating the words in the Clarendon typeface; while the main change was the reduction of BBC radio schedules for three stations to a double-page spread brought down into size, the magazine now generally had between 60 and 68 pages, as compared to the relaunched format from two years earlier, which contained only 52 pages.

From 30 September 1967, Radio Times introduced the all-new colour pages of the magazine's feature sections, including "star stories", Percy Thrower's gardening, Zena Skinner's cookery, Bill Hartley's motoring and Jeffery Boswall's birdwatching, as well as 'Round and About' with up-to-the-minute stories in both television and radio from around the world. At the same time, the four new BBC radio stations (replacing the Home Service, the Light Programme and the Third Programme) were launched within the schedule listing pages:

The layouts of programme page headings have now restyled as well as the three radio pages had been rearranged with schedule billings for Radio 1 and Radio 2 on the first, Radio 3 on the second and Radio 4 on the third. In future weeks, it would boast another revised masthead although the same typeface simply a bold symbol "BBC TV" to the right of the title – within the price, date and regional edition being overprinted in letterpress at the top of the front page, but the letters section and the crossword were placed inside the back page.

On 6 September 1969, Radio Times was given another radical makeover, as they switched the date format from 'month-day-year' to 'day-month-year' and ceased carrying cigarette advertisements after 46 years. The new format inside with the first three pages were devoted to an abbreviated listing of all the week's BBC television and radio programmes in a simple condensed form, within major changes were noticeable on the feature pages as well as the colour ones were spread out to accompany rather than the centre page. The look of the magazine initially became far more restrained, with less white space between columns and headings. More significantly, the lifestyle section (which covered motoring, gardening and cookery) and the crossword were completely dropped, and the highlights section was scrapped. The front cover was surrounded by a black border and italicised its masthead (now in the Caslon typeface with swash capitals; this logo remained until April 2001), in an attempt to emphasize the "R" for radio and "T" for television. From 5 July 1975, the magazine was given a refreshed layout which consisted of horizontal black bars from top to bottom with the familiar darker-shaded look; by this time, the BBC's television schedules included a 'colour' annotation which was dropped eight years later, as well as programmes in black and white were never indicated with the exception of feature films originally made for the cinema.

Another major change occurred on 18 November 1978, in response to wavelength changes (took place on 23 November) that enabled Scotland, Wales and Northern Ireland to receive their own separate domestic services in addition to Radio 4 (also known as the national 'Radio 4 UK' service remained until 29 September 1984), the arrival of these services on the pages forced all BBC radio stations into a six-column grid. On 30 August 1980, Radio Times developed a new double-page spread of Robert Ottaway's highlights from the week ahead, often used for both BBC radio and television programmes. The regular inside back page section for younger listeners and viewers featured content from Newsround presenter John Craven and a selection of new puzzles created by the television producer Clive Doig, such as the trackword (which consisted of nine squares in one word), as well as backstage stories and a comic strip of Peter Lord's Morph at the bottom of the page.

Between March and December 1983, Radio Times had severe industrial disputes when the British Printing & Communications Corporation and the union SOGAT 82 joined forces, and production was affected due to printing problems:
 23 March – The BBC regrets that the printers for next week's edition are in short supply, but copies will be available in the South West, the West of England, North East, and many parts of South and the North of England.
 7 April – The BBC expects copies of the magazine will be available in Scotland, Northern Ireland and North of England from 16 April, following the print workers in East Kilbride and near Bristol returning to work.
 4 June – The general election special issue with the combined England edition, as well as the three constituent nations (Scotland, Wales and Northern Ireland) across throughout the country was used for one week only.
 16 July – The magazine was finally returned to the fully-regionalised form with complete details of all BBC television channels and radio stations for national, regional and local.
 10 December – The magazine was printed and published as the single national edition once again, due to a print workers' strike from the previous week.

On 23 June 1984, the radio listings were redesigned again to improve their legibility and paving the way for a new printing technology. That same year (1 September), web-offset printing was used for the first time, meaning the magazine became brighter and more colourful. Newsprint and sheets of gravure gave way to black ink and white paper, Helvetica replaced Franklin Gothic for a larger character style, and the television listings were also redesigned including the new film icon and the 'today at a glance' sidebar on the far right of pages were added. Starting from 11 October 1986, the new family viewing policy warned readers that BBC Television does not broadcast programmes before 9.00pm which it believed to be unsuitable for children. On 5 September 1987, Radio Times introduces an innovative title called 'Upfront This Week' devoting the first three pages of illustrated snippets to provide the latest programme highlights from all BBC television and radio networks.

On 19 November 1988, Radio Times launched a new weekly back page section called 'My Kind of Day', which was devoted to the latest star interviews with various special guests. Also on the same year (17 December), its popularity climaxed when the Christmas edition sold an astounding 11,220,666 copies, and the Guinness Book of Records certified it as the biggest-selling edition of any British magazine in history. On 25 March 1989 (during Easter), a general overhaul of page layout and design took place, with a major makeover for the programme schedules and the channel headings being visible in greater clarity; BBC1 and BBC2 were once again separated, with the return of the late 1950s/early 1960s layout – television at the front and radio at the back. The week's Radio 1 schedules occupied a single page, followed by Radio 2 (with a facing pair of pages), then several pages of Radio 3 (five pages) and Radio 4 (six pages), and finally the BBC Local Radio listings; regional features, which had absent from the English editions since the late 1960s, resumed with a localised page. Later on 25 November of that year, the radio schedules were restored to two pages for each day; some of the English editions now had daily editorial features on radio as well.

From 2 June 1990, the entire magazine was published in colour for the first time, and another layout began usage; the day's listings began with a single page of highlights that included 'at a glance', followed by the double-page spreads of BBC television channels (BBC1 always occupied the left page and BBC2 for the right page, without advertisements interrupting the listings) and BBC radio stations, now enlivened with colour logos at the top of the pages. This layout only lasted for six months, when a new refreshed format debuted in the Christmas edition (22 December); while the programme listing pages were largely the same, the colour-coded days of the week were now at the top of the page headings.

On 16 February 1991 (the same date for the debut of the new BBC1 and BBC2 idents), the deregulation of television listings began, and Radio Times started to cover all services that include ITV, Channel 4 and satellite networks, an alphabetical list of the commercial radio stations available with the frequency and a two or three-word summary of that station's output which was added to the local radio page. Full complete listings of the four main channels and satellite began on Friday 1 March.

Prior to deregulation, the five weekly listings magazines were as follows:
 Radio Times carried the programme schedule listings for BBC radio and television channels, including the new Radio 5 launched on 27 August 1990.
 The ITV-published magazine TV Times, launched on 22 September 1955, carried programme listings for ITV, and Channel 4 from 2 November 1982. The regional ITV companies produced their own listings magazines – Look Westward (WTV), The Viewer (Tyne Tees), TV Guide (STV), TV Post (Ulster), Television Weekly (TWW/ITSWW/Harlech), Wales TV/Teledu Cymru (WWN) and TV World (ATV/ABC) – were published before TV Times went national on 21 September 1968.
 Sbec, a pull-out weekly listings supplement (first published on 1 November 1982) which is distributed free with the Wales edition of TV Times, containing the full details of S4C's schedules in both Welsh and English, as well as Channel 4's programmes were also included.
 Rupert Murdoch's new publication TV Guide launches on 19 March 1989, carried the 28 pages of Astra satellite (1A) television listings for various Sky channels (including Sky One, Sky News, Sky Movies, Eurosport, and from 15 December 1990, Sky Arts, Movie Channel, Power Station and Sports Channel were added after the BSB merger on the Marcopolo system), MTV, RTL Véronique (for English programmes), Screensport, Children's Channel, Lifestyle with a highlights of BBC, ITV and Channel 4 listings.
 In the Republic of Ireland, Raidió Teilifís Éireann published the RTÉ Guide (formerly the RTV Guide) launched on 1 December 1961, it offered detailed programme listings for RTÉ's television and radio channels. From 8 January 1977, they switched from tabloid format to a compact magazine size and also changes from monochrome into colour, while listings were carried for Radio Luxembourg, AFN and BBC Northern Ireland were later dropped on 8 July 1966, but only the RTÉ programme schedules up until 13 April 1991.
Today, both publications carry listings for all major terrestrial, cable and satellite television channels in the United Kingdom and following deregulation, new listings magazines such as Mirror Group's TV First, IPC Media's What's on TV, Bauer Media Group's TV Quick and Hamfield Publications' TV Plus began to be published; several newspapers were also allowed to print television schedules for the entire forthcoming week on a Saturday (or a Sunday), where previously they had only been able to list each day's programmes in that edition.

With another major refresh on 31 August 1991, the four extra pages of satellite television listings and one page of the highlights section were scrapped and replaced by a number of ten satellite networks (with two more includes Comedy Channel and CNN International were added) from top to bottom; the daytime schedules for BBC1 and BBC2 flanked the satellite listings on the left, with ITV, Channel 4 and 'at a glance' on the right; the main evening schedules for terrestrial television channels retained the same layout. On 5 September 1992, the daytime listings were slightly tweaked, ITV's programme schedules were now sandwiched between BBC2 and Channel 4 within the centre pages, and there were now two pages of satellite and cable channels for each category making up six pages of television listings every day:

During 1993, Radio Times used several layouts were altered throughout the year:
 1 January – The VideoPlus+ number codes to cover all the terrestrial and satellite television channels were added for the first time, which allowed viewers with suitably equipped video recorders to entering the programme's number would ensure to set its timer from taping it.
 2 January – The new 'film premiere' icon appears for terrestrial television listings, replacing the phrase "first showing on network television".
 30 April – The second national commercial station Virgin 1215 is launched and appears in the local radio listings page.
 5 June – The radio schedules are given a radical makeover, with highlights on the right includes day-by-day Virgin 1215, Classic FM and BBC World Service added to each page; the local radio listings now incorporated the weekly frequency guide, and the television schedule pages saw the introduction of the year of production shown in brackets for film titles.
 19 June – The categories for satellite television listings were completely rearranged, with the news section includes Sky One moving to the left and the sport section moving to the right, also adding BSkyB's film classifications at the bottom corner on the left page.
 24 July – Two former cable-only services (Bravo and Discovery) appeared in the entertainment section following their launch on satellite, and the cable television listings were relegated to the bottom, meaning the sport section was no longer used.
 1 September – With the introduction of Sky Multichannels package on the new Astra 1C system, three new services (UK Living, Family Channel and Nickelodeon) were launched as well as CMT Europe; all were added to the previously-unused entertainment section.
 11 September – The satellite television listings is given a redesigned layout, starting with the new movie planner section (providing the latest film titles in alphabetical order on various channels at different times every day); other changes included the new factual section (including Discovery, Sky News and CNN International) that replaced the news category, and the sport section returned.
 18 September – The British versions of TNT and Cartoon Network were added to the movie planner and entertainment sections respectively.
 25 September – The daytime listings were changed once again, with 'at a glance' now on the right page and advertisements occupying the left page. The channel heading logos were reduced into smaller horizontal bars on columns adjacent to those used for terrestrial television listings, a new children's television section (with Children's Channel, Nickelodeon and Cartoon Network) was added, and the cable listings including Super Channel were moved to the left side next to the movie planner section (with Asia Vision, Wire TV and Learning Channel being removed).
 1 October – The British version of QVC launches, appearing at the bottom corner in the entertainment section.
 26 December – The final Christmas Sunday listings used both on television and radio for the very last time, this practice has now fallen out of common usage believed to result from the legalisation of Sunday trading in England and Wales for the following year.

Radio Times design was refreshed on 3 September 1994, the television listings now had the day's name written vertically, beginning with the daytime section including 'today's choices' (which replaced 'at a glance' on the left page), followed by the main evening's schedules in an original four-column grid, as well as the highlights section (now occupying the far left page within the satellite listings), and the movie planner is now on the right page. On 29 March 1997, the programme pages in the television section were restyled often include smaller headings and more billing type with several changes in this layout between the narrower columns for regional variations on the left and Channel 5 schedules on the right page. Yet another major revamp took place on 25 September 1999, where all the pages now proceeded in a particular order, starting with the letters section, followed by film reviews, then the seven-day programme guide with six pages for television (including satellite) and two pages for radio, as well as the single-page crossword and local radio listings with frequencies, and finally the 'My Kind of Day' for the back page which was preceded by classified advertisements. The programme page headings were returned to being inside a coloured block, and the primetime television listings went from two narrow columns to one wide column. The warning phrase "contains strong language", used for BBC television programmes from 9.00pm during the hours of watershed broadcasting restrictions was also implemented at this time, lasting until 2009.

This layout lasted until shortly before Easter on 13 April 2001, which saw the new masthead title with the BBC's corporate typeface Gill Sans (used until the end of 2004, being replaced by Interstate in the start of 2005), while the programme pages with eight pages of television listings reverted to having the day running across the top of the page horizontally, and the satellite listings expanded into four pages, while the double-page movie planner section for 18 different film channels was retained. On 26 November 2002, NTL and BBC Worldwide announced a major new agreement that would offer an exclusive, tailored edition of Radio Times to every NTL customer across the United Kingdom every week, it would be delivered directly to subscribers' homes. The special NTL edition of Radio Times replaced the monthly Cable Guide magazine (which ran from September 1986 to December 2002) and contained programme information for NTL channels, including all terrestrial services; Front Row's pay-per-view movies and events were also included. Subscribers were offered the first four weekly issues of the new title for the same price as the existing monthly magazine, delivered free to homes in time for the first programme week of 4 January 2003; both companies actively and jointly marketed the new edition.

From 30 October 2004, the programme schedule pages were revamped again, with the regional variations now at the bottom of the daytime section, as well as the same spread on the five main channels; BBC3, BBC4, ITV2, ITV3 (launched on 1 November) and More4 (from 10 October 2005) now appeared in digital/cable section on the right page, with a children's section in a single page on the left. The category sections for digital, satellite and cable listings also returned after a four-year absence:

On 22 May 2007, two extra pages of television listings per day were added as part of a slight tweak in the publication's format, bringing it up to ten pages of listings per day in total, or five double-page spreads: one page of highlights with daytime listings and regional variations, followed by two pages of evening's terrestrial television listings (with 'at a glance' for nine digital channels until 2010), then six pages of listings for digital, satellite and cable channels. Digital radio listings were integrated into the main radio pages, and three new pages of sport, lifestyle and music were added. By 11 April 2009, the digital, satellite and cable schedules were reshuffled (alongside entertainment, factual and children's sections) preceded by 'today's choices' on the left side, and the sport section moves to the right side as well as the films section having also started on the left within the centre pages horizontally.

10 April 2010 saw major changes as Radio Times went through a overhaul, with two pages of the latest reviews and highlights ('choices') somewhat akin to the TV Times, while the daytime listings moved onto the evening section having the full day's output for the five main channels on one double-page spread to complete the set:

 Choices (includes 'pick of the day' and 'film of the day')
 Main channels (with daytime listings and regional variations)
 Freeview
 Satellite and cable (with children's television listings)
 Films / Sport
 Radio (includes 'radio in your area' section)

Other changes saw the evening listings start at 5.00pm rather than 6.30pm (sometimes earlier than 5.00pm for weekends, bank holidays, Easter, Christmas and New Year), the addition of electronic program guide numbers into the channel headers, and the inclusion of director and year of production details for Film4 throughout the day. For the London 2012 Olympics, the listings for three terrestrial channels (BBC2, ITV and Channel 4) temporarily moved onto the right page and Channel 5 was moved to the next page on the left, as to provide enough space for BBC1 and BBC3/BBC4 as the Olympic broadcasters, which also reminded viewers of using both the red button and online for BBC channels with additional broadcasts.

Following the closure of the BBC3 channel on 20 February 2016, Radio Times started to include BBC4 in the main channels section, with Channel 5 being relegated to the Freeview section. As of 24 March 2020 to coincide the launch of Disney+, Radio Times introduced two new sections for podcasts and six pages devoted to streaming and various catch-up services. That same year (8 September), the rearrangement of Freeview channel listings with Sky Arts moves to the second page, also the three columns in the satellite and cable pages now have on the left side with children's television section, as well as the six film services were also included.

During the Tokyo Olympics (which was delayed due to global COVID-19 pandemic) on 20 July 2021, Radio Times declared its special bumper issue with 212 pages that include 16-day listings of the BBC's coverage and an comprehensive easy-to-use guide preceded by two pages with 'pick of the action' chosen by various pundits, although this layout becoming slightly different whether listings started on the left page with two columns for BBC1 as a dedicated Olympic broadcaster (including BBC Red Button occupies at the bottom) and BBC2 in the single column, as well as ITV, Channel 4 and BBC4 schedules placed on the right page. From 25 January 2022, the Freeview schedules have altered once again starting with the return of BBC3 (launches on 1 February after six years since the television channel has moved online), whether ITV2's listings now occupies at the bottom, as well as the seven remaining services were also placed in the second and third pages respectively.

From 4 October 2022 (three weeks before the BBC's 100th anniversary celebrations), Radio Times refreshed its format:
 The 'this week' section which was devoted to the best entertainment reviews with all latest news over the next seven days, as well as other features including the grapevine, ten questions, viewpoint and 'on the box' as fronted by broadcaster Jane Garvey.
 The expanded pages of the streaming section provides the best of catch-up services for television and films (include free-to-view, subscription or premium) so you want to watch every day.
 The double-page 'highlights' section has given a newly-refreshed layout dedicated to the most comprehensive guide of programmes throughout the week ahead with 'also on today', 'live sport' and 'film of the day' also included.
 The third page of the Freeview section includes some of its children's television schedules sandwiched between the top two channels. Food Network and Blaze) were added as requested by readers and the number of movie channels was reduced from 18 to eight within the centre pages, with the latest film reviews which also embedded into each day's listings occupied by the right hand side.
 The last two pages of satellite/cable schedules followed by the sport section was incorporated into a 'quick and easy' planner with various times by using individual live coverage of other events, as well as channel numbers (include Sky Sports, BT Sport, Eurosport and Premier Sports) were listed in the bottom right corner. Three weeks later (18 October), the mainstream sport listings were reverted back to any channel rather than popular events.

Circulation
In 1934, Radio Times achieved a circulation of two million and its net profit in that year was more than one quarter of the total BBC licence income. By the 1950s, Radio Times had grown to be the magazine with the largest circulation in Europe, with an average sale of 8.8 million in 1955. Following the 1969 relaunch, circulation indeed dropped by about a quarter of a million, it would take several years to recover but the magazine remained ahead of glossier lifestyle-led competitor, TV Times. In the mid-1970s, it was just over four million; but in 2013 it was just over one million.

During a major revamp in April 2010, Radio Times was the third-biggest-selling magazine in the United Kingdom. However, according to the Audit Bureau of Circulations, the magazine experienced about 2.2% year-on-year decrease to an average weekly sale of 1,648,000 in the second half of 2009. It averaged a circulation per issue of 497,852 between July and December 2020, versus 1,041,826 for TV Choice and 690,617 for What's on TV.

Advertising
During the deregulation of television listings, there was strong criticism from other magazines that Radio Times was advertised on the BBC (as well as on commercial broadcasting channels), saying that it gave unfair advantage to a publication and includes the tagline: "If it's on, it's in". The case went to court, but the outcome was that, as the Radio Times had close connections with the BBC, it would be allowed to be advertised by the BBC; however, from 1992 until 2004, it had to depict a static picture of the cover, and show a clear disclaimer reading "Other television listings magazines are available", leading to the phrase entering common public usage for a time.

By the early 2000s, advertisements for the publication had become sparse on the BBC. Radio Times has not been promoted on BBC television and radio channels since 2005, following complaints by rival publications that the promotions were unfair competition.

Missing issues
For various reasons, some issues were not printed. These include:

Diminished form
Printing disputes and other operational difficulties have also led to the magazine appearing in a different formats to the standard:

Editors
There have been 20 editors of Radio Times to date (including one uncredited and one returning) since the magazine began publication:

 1923–1926: Leonard Crocombe
 1926–1927: Walter Fuller
 1927–1933: Eric Maschwitz
 1933–1941: Maurice Gorham
 1941–1944: Gordon Stowell
 1944–1954: Tom Henn
 1954–1968: Douglas G. Williams
 1968–1969: C. J. Campbell Nairne
 1969–1979: Geoffrey Cannon
 1979–1988: Brian Gearing
 1988–1996: Nicholas Brett
 1996–2000: Sue Robinson
 2000–2001: Nicholas Brett (returned)
 2001–April 2002: Nigel Horne
 April–July 2002: Liz Vercoe (uncredited)
 August 2002–August 2009: Gill Hudson
 September 2009 – 2017: Ben Preston
 2017–2020: Mark Frith
 2020–present: Tom Loxley and Shem Law

Covers
When the magazine was a BBC publication, the covers had a BBC bias (in 2005, 31 of the 51 issues had BBC-related covers) and consisting of a single side of glossy paper, however the magazine often uses double or triple-width covers that open out for several large group photographs.

Each year, Radio Times celebrates those individuals and programmes that are featured at the Covers Party, where framed oversized versions of the covers are presented. Radio Times had several sporting events with more than one of the Home Nations (such as the Six Nations, UEFA European Championship, Commonwealth Games and the Rugby World Cup) taking part are often marked with different covers for each nation, showing their own team.

While the major events (such as Remembrance Day, Crufts, the Oscars/BAFTAs, Eurovision Song Contest, Wimbledon Championships, Glastonbury Festival and the Proms) or new series of popular programmes are marked by producing different covers were actually used for other collectors:
 The first person of colour to feature on the front cover was the American singer Paul Robeson, in the 535th issue which dated on 29 December 1933.
 Radio Times declared its special 'Coronation Number' issue on 31 May 1953 with a record-breaking 9,012,358 copies sold, as well as Eric Fraser's heraldic cover illustration and also made the back page depicted his lion and the unicorn tucking into an advertisement for Bachelors tinned foods. It was the first artwork cover since before World War II by the presses at Waterlow and Sons couldn't print in full colour but the existing technology allowed a yellowish gold tint between the back and front within a red crown motif running across the magazine. Fraser was the revered illustrator who had worked for the publication between 1926 and 1982, until his death on 15 November 1983 at the age of 81.
 Radio Times celebrated the Apollo 11 moon landing on 10 July 1969, with this cover bearing the "TARGET MOON" caption at the top of the Saturn V rocket lifts off from Kennedy Space Center as part of the NASA's Apollo mission.
 During BBC Television's 50th anniversary on 1 November 1986, Tony McSweeney's cover illustration depicted a 1930s family living in the shadow of Alexandra Palace somehow watching the title sequence of Nine O'Clock News on a modern colour set.
 23 February 1991 saw Radio Times began offering a comprehensive programme schedule guide to BBC, ITV, Channel 4 and various satellite networks (from Friday 1 March) bearing the "If it's on, it's in" tagline, which includes Arnold Schwarzenegger on the cover focusing about the former Mr. Universe and successfully become the biggest film career in Hollywood. There was also a mixed reaction for the deregulation of television listings had occurred and allow information on all channels to be printed as they showing material by the broadcasters with its other competitors.
 On 26 March 1994, to coincide the relaunch of Radio 5 as 'Five Live' (the new rolling news and sport service which took place on 28 March) within the group consists of Nelson Mandela, Bill and Hillary Clinton, Boris Yeltsin, John Major and Benazir Bhutto to appear on the cover wearing in t-shirts that includes the logo was done by Sven Arnstein, as well as Jones Bloom's electronic retouching but we also told that the sportswear came from Lillywhites and the footwear courtesy of John Lewis.
 A special issue for the 50th anniversary of BBC television news on 3 July 2004, as well as a fold-out cover with BBC news teams (from left to right: Huw Edwards, Fiona Bruce, Anna Ford, George Alagiah, Sophie Raworth, Dermot Murnaghan, Natasha Kaplinsky, Sian Williams, Darren Jordon and Moira Stuart) was photographed by Andy Earl, and also an accompanying special pull-out supplement within the centre pages.
 On 10 February 2007, the second series of Life on Mars, was marked by the Radio Times producing a mock-up of a 1973-style cover promoting the series, placed on page three of the magazine.
 Radio Times reaches its 5,000th edition on 9 May 2020 with excellent lead articles from the support staff and workers of the National Health Service front line during the COVID-19 pandemic known as the coronavirus disease, and also granted this cover showing the colours of the rainbow which uses acrylic paint in a plain white background.

Royal specials
Over the past years, Radio Times published special majestic covers (often marked as a 'souvenir' issue) dedicated to royalty which reflects the monarchy of the United Kingdom, as well as other significant events include birthdays, coronations, jubilees, royal weddings, state funerals and various celebrations across the decades.

Between February 1952 and September 2022, Radio Times focuses about Queen Elizabeth II is the nation's longest-serving monarch which represented over eight decades during its 70-year reign:
 The informal picture of Prince Charles and Queen Elizabeth II was taken by photographer Joan Williams for the cover in this issue on 21 June 1969, during the making of Richard Cawston's 110-minute documentary film Royal Family which is watched over 30.6 million television viewers almost half the population that includes an estimated global audience of 350 million people. Despite having been repeated ten times in eight years until it was withdrawn from circulation on 11 August 1977, and broadcasters were asked by Buckingham Palace not to be shown again in its entirety.
 To celebrate Queen Elizabeth II's Silver Jubilee on 28 May 1977, Radio Times joined forces with BBC1's Blue Peter in running a competition for children to design a special cover which it led to a staggering 65,000 entrants include Nicola Griffin was the youngest-ever artist talks to Newsround presenter John Craven reported her painting of a jolly guardsman, as well as John Noakes going behind the scenes at the printers to watch the first of its three-and-a-half million copies come off the presses. The following week (4 June), they took its unusual step of commissioning a tapestry made by Candace Bahouth for the artwork cover of this issue, and also been adapted for the 116-page bookazine in 2022.
 Royal photographer Lord Snowdon was behind the camera for this special majestic cover with a double portrait of Queen Elizabeth II and Prince Philip to celebrate their 50th wedding anniversary on 15 November 1997.
 During Queen Elizabeth II's Diamond Jubilee on 2 June 2012, as Radio Times celebrated this event with a majestic cover includes the new portrait painting designed by Peter Blake.
 Queen Elizabeth II officially opened the BBC's newly rebuilt Broadcasting House on 7 June 2013, and was presented with a collection of 44 majestic covers by the BBC Trust chairman Chris Patten.
 Ahead before the 90th birthday of Queen Elizabeth II on 18 April 2016, this jubilant artwork cover was illustrated by Nina Cosford depicts the crowds gathered here at Buckingham Palace. Two months later (11 June), Radio Times deluged with wonderful cover designs from more than 11,000 children across the United Kingdom which include Ayesha Mahmood to become the winner of this competition after her majestic design – showing its vibrant painting of a crown adorned within the purple-riched colour and gold glitter – is picked by our panel of judges that featured Blue Peters Lindsey Russell, Shem Law, Judith Kerr and Ben Preston.
 As part of Queen Elizabeth II's Platinum Jubilee celebrations on 4 June 2022, illustrator James Weston Lewis took inspiration for this artwork cover paying homage to King George VI's coronation special issue on 7 May 1937 was designed by the famous war artist Christopher R. W. Nevinson, with capture some of its classic depiction of the original by adding a few modern elements.
 On 13 September 2022, Radio Times declared this emergency issue paying tribute to Queen Elizabeth II who passes peacefully away at the old age of 96, includes a monochrome photograph from the Camera Press with its darker sombre effect and surrounded by black border. A special commemorative edition was published on 20 September of that year containing 30 pages throughout her life and reign which reproduced nine majestic covers to chart of each decade, as well as the striking silhouette portrait also used by permission for kind agreement of the Royal Mint.

Doctor Who
Doctor Who is the most represented programme on the cover, appearing on 29 issues (with 35 separate covers due to multiples) in the 49 years since the programme began on 23 November 1963.

On 30 April 2005, a double-width cover was used to commemorate the return of the Daleks to Doctor Who and the forthcoming general election. This cover recreated a scene from the 1964 serial The Dalek Invasion of Earth in which the Daleks were seen crossing Westminster Bridge with the Houses of Parliament and Big Ben in the background, and also the cover text read "VOTE DALEK!". On 29 September 2008, the contest was sponsored by the Periodical Publishers Association, this cover was voted the best British magazine cover of all time. Five years later (on 17 April 2010) before the next general election, our three special covers depicting the Daleks invading the capital once more within showing their true colours of red, blue and yellow as one of several Britain's political parties for Labour, Conservative and Liberal Democrats were used individually.

Throughout the decades, Radio Times had covers for various television specials and anniversary editions:
 On 19 November 1983, the show celebrated its 20th anniversary with a standalone special featuring Tom Baker, Patrick Troughton, Peter Davison, Jon Pertwee, Richard Hurndall (who replaced William Hartnell, who died on 23 April 1975) and Anthony Ainley as The Master. They featured in an illustrated cover by Andrew Skilleter.
 On 20 November 1993, as the show marked its 30th anniversary, the surviving actors who had played The Doctor appeared to promote the special television event, a crossover between EastEnders as part of the BBC's annual Children in Need telethon. 3D glasses were sold in aid of the charity enhanced viewing of several programmes broadcast throughout the week, and the first Doctor Who episode to be aired since the series ended on 6 December 1989.
 Doctor Who returned to television on 25 May 1996 after a seven-year absence, as Paul McGann starred in a feature-length television special with a corresponding cover, and a 16-page pull-out supplement.
 A themed night on BBC2 on 13 November 1999, was marked by a specially commissioned Dalek portrait photographed by Lord Snowdon, which was originally used as a stamp design.
 For its 40th anniversary on 22 November 2003, a commemorative cover was photographed by Andy Earl to create a panoramic vista featuring Colin Baker, Sylvester McCoy, Tom Baker and Peter Davison, as well as the TARDIS, K-9, a Cyberman and the two Daleks.
 The 23 November 2013 issue marked the 50th anniversary of the programme with a selection of 12 different covers.

Christmas

The cover of the 'Christmas Number' (as this issue came to be called) dating from the time when it contained just a single week's listings, usually features a generic festive artwork, atypical for the magazine, which since the 1970s has almost exclusively used photographic covers. In recent years, Radio Times has published and sold packs of reproductions of some of the Christmas covers of the magazine as Christmas cards.

Annuals and guides
An annual was published three times: in 1954, 1955 and 1956.

The Radio Times Film & Video Guide by the magazine's film and video editor Derek Winnert was first published in 1994 featuring more than 18,000 films and an introduction by Barry Norman, former presenter of the BBC's Film programme. A second edition was published the following year. In 2000, a completely new Radio Times Guide to Films was published by BBC Worldwide, edited by Kilmey Fane-Saunders, featuring more than 21,000 film titles. The last edition of Radio Times Guide to Films was published in 2018.

There are also similar publications, the Radio Times Guide to TV Comedy by Mark Lewisohn and the Radio Times Guide to Science-Fiction.

Regional editions
Until the first edition of 2023, there several regional editions in England which contained different schedules for localised programming, all editions of Radio Times carry variations of adjoining regions for television and radio.

Prior to the cessation of the regional English additions, the stations carried were as follows:

Every local television station had its own edition consisting of 15 BBC regional services and 13 ITV companies were also used:

Radio
Since its began on 28 September 1923 (during the interwar period), there was just a single national edition to cover all the BBC wireless services including relay stations from 1924:

From 10 October 1926, the two separate regions – 'Northern' and 'Southern' – were published before Radio Times reverted to one edition and covering all the local stations once again on 7 January 1934:

Between 1930 and 1935, many of the original 21 BBC local stations eventually reduced to six regional services (including Wales from 1937) as well as five national variations with the exceptions of Plymouth, Bournemouth, Aberdeen and Stagshaw were remained until 1939 before the outbreak of World War II:

After the end of World War II in Europe, the seven local variations were resumed on 29 July 1945 which also used by BBC Home Service as they referred similar to its pre-war Regional Programme during the 1930s.

November 1967 saw the introduction of BBC Local Radio whether these regional areas subdivided with individual editions for each English county (except Isle of Man), as well as the national regions and several opt-out services were also used. This continued between February 1981 and January 1983 until each regional edition began to cover three local stations which was previously used by regional news and opt-out programming on Radio 4, apart from the South West (including the Channel Islands) as this is now the only part of England still without any BBC local station. During the mid-1980s and early 1990s, a number of 13 new BBC local stations were added to covering the whole areas throughout the United Kingdom:

Television
In November 1936, Radio Times launches its first television service in the London area only before they closed down on 1 September 1939 by the duration of war for over six years and finally resumed on 7 June 1946. When the second channel began in 1964, there were a number of areas where only certain parts of a region could get receive this service until 1966:

From 1 March 1991, Radio Times started carrying ITV and Channel 4 listings to begin they cover the 14 regional editions (which later reduced to ten areas) across the country:

At the same time, regional editions also included several local television stations used individually as well as the neighbouring countries outside Great Britain where available:

Alterations
The number of regional editions has been altered over the years within gradually being reduced over time due to there being fewer variations in the programme schedules:
 The North of England region was separated from Northern Ireland on 4 January 1948 who had their own edition.
 The spread of television editions when full listings (with six pages) were not included in all issues between 7 June 1946 and 15 August 1952.
 On 8 October 1960, the Midlands region was renamed 'Midlands and East Anglia', and the West of England region was also renamed 'South and West'.
 On 9 February 1964, the launch of BBC Cymru Wales television service in the Welsh edition of Radio Times with its own programme schedule pages from the prominent heading (remained until 1982), without detracting from the service they provided to English viewers on the other side of the Severn Estuary.
 As from 21 March 1964, the previously unmarked London region was successfully renamed 'London and South East'. It was later dropped on 25 March 1989 when the 'London' name is no longer used, became known as 'South East', and later reverted to its original name on 23 February 1991.
 On 29 August 1970, the four English regional editions (along the constituent nations) were separated into ten areas, such as the administrative counties of Cumberland and Westmorland (which included the Furness exclave in Lancashire and the district of Sedburgh in the West Riding of Yorkshire) before the creation of a new non-metropolitan county of Cumbria from 1 April 1974 under the Local Government Act 1972 in England and Wales.
 Between 1 November 1982 and 22 February 1991, S4C listings were included in the Wales edition known as 'Rhaglenni Cymraeg' (Welsh programmes), while its English language programming were simply billed as 'Rhaglenni Saesneg' with no further detail being given. TV Times included a pull-out supplement Sbec which gave full details on all S4C programming in both languages. From the following week, it also took the billing space by cutting down on the detail in the Channel 4's listings in that edition, and allowing S4C to share some of its space.
 After the deregulation of television listings on 1 March 1991, they rebranded the Northern Ireland edition as 'Ulster' (named after the historic Irish province), and started including listings for the Irish state broadcaster's two channels – RTÉ1 and Network 2 – were occupied the lower half of the three columns devoted to UTV's schedules.
 Radio Times used to have three separate editions for STV, Grampian and Border (also appearing in the North East edition) while just then after a while they merged back into one Scotland edition from 6 July 1991.
 No edition of Radio Times in the Channel Islands as their listing schedules were contained within the South West region, but Channel TV published its own listings magazine, the CTV Times (formerly Channel Viewer) until 25 October 1991.
 The Yorkshire region was absorbed by the North East region on 25 September 1993 became known as 'Yorkshire/Tyne Tees', and also later added the North West region on 7 April 2007.
 The exception to this process of merging is Wales on 31 August 1991, which used to be part of a larger 'Wales/West' (of England), mirroring the HTV area. The region was separated on 16 April 2005 leaving the West of England to join South and South West edition. The two regional editions of London and East Anglia were merged on the same date.
 On 5 November 2001, BBC 2W launches as the digital-only service in Wales used for weekday evenings from 8.30pm to 10.00pm, within BBC2's listings in the normal column is mainly split vertically in two to cover both the analogue and digital services. The digital-only service was ceased on 2 January 2009 as part of the digital switchover, and reverts to the normal service with less frequent regional programmes as the arrangement on analogue broadcasts.
 On 25 August 2007, the Midlands and London/Anglia regions were merged.
 On 24 February 2019, Radio Times introduces the BBC Scotland television channel, a new autonomous service that broadcasts an nightly line-up of entirely Scottish-related programming from 7.00pm to midnight replacing the Scotland's version of BBC2 after 53 years, and the listings were occupied by BBC4 at the bottom on the right page.
 Regional editions in England end with the first edition of 2023. London's local TV channel London Live had always been included in the London/Midlands edition and Radio Times continues to list the channel, doing so on the second page of the Freeview section.

Online content

Website
The Radio Times website was launched in June 1997, primarily as a listings service. As from 18 August 2011, it relaunches an offering diverse editorial product to accompany its schedules for television, radio and film recommendations.

Digitisation

In December 2012, the BBC completed a digitisation exercise, scanning the listings of all programmes from an entire run of about 4,500 copies of the magazine from 1923 (the first issue) to 2009, the BBC Genome Project, with a view to creating an online database of its output. They identified around five million programmes, involving 8.5 million actors, presenters, writers and technical staff.

The results were made public on 15 October 2014, Corrections to OCR errors and changes to advertised schedules are being crowdsourced. Digitised editions of entire magazines (including front covers, prose articles, advertisements and other non-listings content) were added:

 1920s (March 2017)
 1930s (December 2017)
 1940s (December 2018)
 1950s (December 2019)

Several addresses, telephone numbers and email addresses have been removed, to prevent readers from attempting to donate to charity appeals that have closed. Some names and trademark terms have been removed for legal reasons.

Puzzles
On 28 September 2020, Radio Times launched its online puzzle site using brainteasers from their archive. Puzzles include those based on television and radio programmes such as Eggheads, Only Connect, Pointless, Channel 4's Countdown and BBC Radio 2's PopMaster.

Podcast
On 8 September 2021, Radio Times introduces the 40-minute podcast show hosted by Jane Garvey and Rhianna Dhillon, which include interviews with television celebrities.

See also
 Most Powerful People – an annual listing charted the three different areas of British media (include TV comedy, TV drama and radio) from January 2003 to June 2005
 Radio Times Extra – a digital programme guide which offers full television listings and synopses throughout 14 days provided by Inview Technology

References

Notes

  Renamed BBC TV on 8 October 1960 and later became BBC1 on 20 April 1964, when BBC2 is launched.
  All these strands including the Third Programme kept their separate identities (such as music, sports coverage and education) within Radio 3 until 4 April 1970, when there was a further reorganisation following the introduction of the structural changes which had been outlined in the BBC document Broadcasting in the Seventies on 10 July 1969.
  In earlier years, the BBC television listing schedules has giving phrases such as 'a film series' used for imported programmes and 'the feature film' were remained until 1 September 1984.
  Between June and December 1990, the layout of programme page sections had given its own distinctive colour were used at the top along with deep pink for films, dark blue for television and medium turquoise for radio, as well as each day of the week often include: red for Saturday, orange for Sunday, magenta for Monday, chartreuse for Tuesday, purple for Wednesday, salmon for Thursday and green for Friday.
  The colours for each day of the week were changed on 22 December 1990, they are: Saturday in red, Sunday in azure blue, Monday in light orange, Tuesday in indigo, Wednesday in dark green, Thursday in cerise, and Friday in medium turquoise. On 30 October 2004, the day's colours were slightly changed once again that includes Tuesday in lavender, Wednesday in mint green, and Friday in navy blue.
  The station is rebranded as Radio 5 Live on 28 March 1994, that replaces educational and children's programmes with a new rolling news format, whilst retaining the sports programmes from the old service.
  Also known as TV Times Magazine from 3 October 1981; rebranded back to its original TV Times name on 6 October 1984.
  From 1956 to 1964, the Midlands originally had their own edition of TV Times carrying ATV and ABC programme listings, but in a separate weekly magazine called TV World on 27 September 1964, for the innovative idea of splitting itself 50:50 with a second cover in the middle allowing for the magazine to be folded over to creating both weekend and weekday sections from one publication, before TV Times went national on 21 September 1968.
  Named after the American magazine of the same name that which devoted to latest celebrities and television reviews. It became a monthly publication from 1991, and it was later absorbed by Satellite TV Europe in 1992.
  On 1 September 2021, Sky One has now ceased broadcasting with all the entertainment shows to be replaced by two new channels, Sky Showcase and Sky Max.
  The service closed on 8 April 1991 and replaced by Sky Movies.
  Replaced by Sky Sports on 20 April 1991.
  TV Plus launched on 1 March 1991 by Hamfield Publications which combines a hybrid women's magazine and the full complete seven-day television listings (for BBC, ITV, Channel 4 and various British Sky Broadcasting networks) which ran from Friday to Thursday, until the publication was ceased after three issues and it was a shortest-lived weekly listings magazine in British history.
  Absorbed by Eurosport on 1 March 1993.
  The two consecutive adults-only services – HVC and Adult Channel – were unsuitabled until 19 December 1992.
  On 19 August 1994, Sky Sports 2 has launched initially as a weekend-only service, which occupies the listings sandwiched between Sky Sports at the top and Eurosport at the bottom.
  Between September 1999 and April 2001, the programme section colours returned once again which was placed halfway throughout the double-page spreads vertically that include royal purple for films, dark orange for television and viridian for radio.
  Originally launched on 5 November 1982, TV Choice is the first weekly listings magazine which provide full schedules for all services (BBC1, BBC2, ITV and Channel 4) that the publication breached their copyright forcing to be suspended on 1 January 1983, along with revamped and more detailed programme billings until it was eventually vanished without trace. Bauer Media Group revived the title used as a low-price listings magazine from its own stable on 14 September 1999.
  On 28 January 2021, a leaked version of the film and publishes online shortly before taken down due to a copyright claim after the BBC sought to have being removed, it was remained available to view on the video-sharing platform YouTube and the digital library website Internet Archive.
  All of four VHF opt-out services from Radio Scotland were ceased broadcasting on 29 January 1993 and the output replaced by local news bulletins throughout each day on 1 February of that year.

Sources

Bibliography
 Tony Currie, The Radio Times Story (2001, Kelly Publications) 
 David Driver, The Art of Radio Times: The First Sixty Years (1981)
 Martin Baker, The Art of Radio Times: A Golden Age of British Illustration 
 R.D. Usherwood, Drawing for Radio Times (1961, Bodley Head)

External links

 
 BBC – History of the Radio Times
 Radio programme about cover art with gallery
 A selection of Vintage Radio Times covers
 BBC Genome - Radio Times listings from 1923 to 2009
 Digitized versions of years 1923 to 1930 and 1936 on the website of the Nederlandse Vereniging voor de Historie van de Radio

BBC history
BBC publications
Weekly magazines published in the United Kingdom
Listings magazines
Magazines established in 1923
1923 establishments in the United Kingdom
Interwar period
United Kingdom in World War II
Radio during World War II
Radio in the United Kingdom
History of television in the United Kingdom
Television magazines published in the United Kingdom